Overland Lake is a glacial tarn in the Ruby Mountains of Elko County in the northeastern part of the state of Nevada. The Ruby Crest National Recreation Trail runs along the eastern shore of the lake.

Overland Lake is the principal source of Overland Creek, which after exiting the mountains flows into Ruby Valley. It was originally named Marian Lake by geologist Clarence King, after his sister, and was the subject of several famous paintings and photographs. This name, however, was lost, and the name of the lake became associated with the Overland Mail and Stage Route, which passed nearby.

External links
 1870's Paintings of Overland Lake

Lakes of Elko County, Nevada
Ruby Mountains
Lakes of Nevada
Lakes of the Great Basin